Rafał Król (born 16 January 1989) is a Polish professional footballer who plays as a midfielder for Motor Lublin. He formerly played for Znicz Pruszków, AÉ Dóxa Kranoúlas and Stal Kraśnik.

Career
Król started his playing career in MUKS Kraśnik. He joined Motor Lublin at age nineteen, and he  made his senior debut on 16 March 2008 in a 4–0 home win against GKS Jastrzębie, coming on as a substitute in the 89th minute. In August 2010, Król moved to Znicz Pruszków. In August 2011, he joined Greek Gamma Ethniki side AÉ Dóxa Kranoúlas. After three seasons, he returned to Motor.

In February 2017, he joined IV liga club Stal Kraśnik. He scored six goals in a 14–0 home win over LKS Milanów on 4 June 2017.

On 15 January 2020, Król signed a contract with Motor Lublin for the third time in his career.

References

External links
 

1989 births
Polish footballers
Motor Lublin players
Znicz Pruszków players
Living people
People from Kraśnik
Stal Kraśnik players
II liga players
III liga players
Association football midfielders